is Mao Abe's first album, released on . It entered the Japanese Oricon album charts at #17, and was in the top 300 for 10 weeks. The album was released in two versions: a regular version and a CD+DVD version only on sale for a limit period of time.

The album was Abe's first physical release, as opposed to the Japanese music industry standard of releasing singles beforehand. All of the songs on this album were written by Abe during 2006-2007 while she was at high school.

When the album was in its final stages, all of the finalised data was lost. The songs had to be rebuilt by Abe and her production team from the original studio recordings.

Promotion
The album was preceded by four digital download singles on iTunes between August and November 2008: all were acoustic demos of Abe songs. Two of these songs,  and "My Baby", were used as album tracks, while the other two (and I Wanna See You) were used as singles after the release of the album.

The lead radio single, did extremely well on airplay charts. It reached #1 on the combined physical sales/airplay-based Billboard chart Japan Hot 100.  A music video, directed by Masaki Ohkita, was made for the song), which appears on the DVD of the album. The song also had three tie-ups: it was used as the music countdown show CDTV January 2009 opening theme song (though it did not chart in the CDTV top 100), the music show Mashup! Musico's January ending theme song and the Glico Pocky commercial for special air on the music video channel Space Shower.

This tie-up came after the album's release, hence the song features as the B-side to Abe's "Tsutaetai Koto/I Wanna See You" single, released four months later.

Track listing

CD
All songs written by Mao Abe.

DVD

Personnel

Mao Abe - acoustic guitar (#1-3, #5, #8-10), arranger (#5, #10), songwriter
Masakazu Andō - arranger (#8-9), producer
Kozo Fujita - art direction, photography
Masao Fukunaga - drums (#2-3)
Ryoji Hachiya - recording (#10), mixing (#5, #10)
Daichi Hamazaki - drums (#8-9)
Tatsurō Hayashi - hair & make-up
Mikihiko Ishibashi - recording (#6, #10)
Hiroyuki Ishimizu - photo assistant
Akihisa Kanbe - supervisor
Teppei Kawasaki - bass guitar (#1-3, #8-9), electric bass guitar (#4), washboard bass (#4)
Kengo - background vocals (#3)
Noriyuki Kisou - recording/mixing (#1, #7)
Kenichi Kobayashi - bass guitar (#7)
Yūichi Komori - arrangement (#1, #3-4, #7)
Minoru Kuriyama - release operator
Akira Matsuo - artist planner
Meg&aska - styling
Tsuyoshi Miyagawa - drums (#1, #4)
Hitomi Mori - sales promoter
N.O.B.U!!! - background vocals (#1)
Katsuhito Nakanishi - A&R director
Aya Ninomiya - artist management
Masaki Ohkita - music video director
Shinji Onitsuka - arranger (#6), piano (#6)
Daisuke Sato - drums (#7)
Toshiyuki Satō - graphic design
Yūichi Sekine - A&R producer
Mitsuo Shimano - executive producer
Takumi Shimizu - executive producer
Skin-headz - arrangement (#2)
Junko Sugawara - electric guitar (#1-3)
Naoki Sugawara - executive producer
Kōji Suzuki - artist management
Yuji Suzuki - publishing promoter
Kensuke Takeshima - coordinator
Yoshiyuki Tanaka - acoustic guitar (#4, #7), electric guitar (#4, #7)
Yutaka Uematsu - mastering, recording/mixing (#2-4, #8-9)
Kenichiro Wada - electric guitar (#4, #8-9)

Charts

Various charts

References

External links
Pony Canyon profile 
Translations of the album's lyrics into English

Mao Abe albums
2009 debut albums
Pony Canyon albums